Palana is a rural locality on Flinders Island in the local government area of Flinders in the North-east region of Tasmania. The 2016 census determined a population of 21 for the state suburb of Palana.

History
Palana was gazetted as a locality in 1970.

Geography
Bass Strait forms the western, northern and eastern boundaries.

Road infrastructure
The B85 route (Palana Road) enters from the south-west and runs to the village in the north-west.

References

Flinders Island
Towns in Tasmania